This is a list of German language exonyms for towns located in Hungary.

Complete list

See also
German exonyms
List of European exonyms

References

 
Hungary
German
German